Canoe Lake is in Thunder Bay District, Ontario, Canada, about  west of Savant Lake. Its primary inflow, at the northwest corner, and outflow, at the southwest corner, is Barnard Creek, a tributary of the Sturgeon River. The Canadian National Railway transcontinental mainline travels along the north side of the lake.

References

Lakes of Thunder Bay District